The Independent Order of Rechabites (IOR), also known as the Sons and Daughters of Rechab, is a fraternal organisation and friendly society founded in England in 1835 as part of the wider temperance movement to promote total abstinence from alcoholic beverages. Always well connected in upper society and involved in financial matters, it gradually transformed into a financial institution which still exists, and still promotes abstinence. The Order has been active in Australia from 1843, promoting temperance and as a benefit society. A branch was established in the United States in 1842, and also flourished for a time. In the United Kingdom, the Order trades under the name of Healthy Investment.

History 

The Independent Order of Rechabites was founded on 25 August 1835 as the Salford Unity of Rechabites, in the city of Salford, Lancashire, England. Their first lodge was ""Tent Ebenezer #1" and soon "tents" were  founded for adult females (over the age of 12), boys (aged 12–16), and for children of both sexes (age 5-12), as well as other adult males (age 16 and up.) In describing the heritage of the Independent Order of Rechabites, a circa 1892 newspaper in Leeds said:

The rituals and ceremonies of the Rechabites vary from place to place but the order promoted three degrees, Knight of Temperance, Knight of Fortitude, and Covenanted Knight of Justice. Lodges are called tents because Jehonadab (or Jonadab) commanded the Biblical sons of Rechab to live in tents (Jeremiah 35:6-7) and the governing body, in England at least, was called the Movable Committee, meeting in a different city every two years. Membership remains open to all who would sign a pledge to completely abstain from alcohol except for religious or medical purposes. There were also death and sickness benefits.

From the late 18th century a number of Friendly Societies had been set up to help working-class people with such things as health insurance and death benefits. Generally these societies held their meetings in pubs. In the 1830s a group of Manchester Methodists became concerned that by encouraging working men to attend public houses to pay their friendly society dues, then the societies were harming the men's health and financial situation and threatening their moral welfare, rather than helping them. To counter this they set up a new Friendly Society called the Independent Order of Rechabites, named after the nomadic, abstaining Rechabites of the Old Testament. The IOR were an offshoot of the Calathumpians, then a diverse collection of social reformers of independent religious views. The organization was still active in the middle 20th century; Sir David Cannadine (British historian, born in Birmingham in 1950) described in 2019 attending a Rechabite meeting with his grandparents who were members.

A branch may be known as a "Tent", since the biblical Rechabites lived exclusively in tents. Each Tent is ruled by a High Chief Ruler, assisted by a High Deputy Ruler, Corresponding Secretary, Sick and Tent Stewards, Inside and Outside Guardians, a Levite of the Tent and a number of Elders. Before one could join the Rechabites and benefit from their insurance and saving scheme a document has to be signed swearing that the proposed member and his family would not drink any alcoholic beverages. This document is known as The Pledge and represents a solemn promise. The initials "IOR" on a tombstone may indicate that the deceased was a member of the organisation.

The Victoria District of the Independent Order of Rechabites currently has 17 Tents and 5 Regions, while the Queensland District of The Independent Order of Rechabites currently has four Tents and two social committees.

United States and Canada 

In the United States and Canada there were several orders of Rechabites including the Independent Order of Rechabites of North America and the Encamped Knights of Rechab of North America. The most successful, however, was the Independent Order of Rechabites, which was founded in 1842 and was reported to have 990,000 at the beginning of the twentieth century. Like the Order in Britain, its local groups were called Tents. The national structure was the "High Tent" and the order was headquartered in Washington, DC. Membership was open to males aged 16 to 55, females aged twelve and up, and juveniles aged 5-16; the primary tents were composed of males 16–55 years old who believed in a Supreme Being and signed a total abstinence pledge. Individuals over fifty five were admitted as honorary members, and females over twelve and males under sixteen were permitted to form their own Tents. The Order worked three degrees: Knight of Temperance, Knight of Fortitude and Covenanted Knight of Justice.

Australia
 In Australia the IOR was first established in Tasmania in 1843, soon spreading to other states. Members of the IOR were provided with assistance during times of sickness, death and hardship.

IOR was active in Victoria and in 1876 it established 'Tent' 138 in Bung Bong rural Victoria. The Building was also used for community purposes including meetings of the 'Farmers Club' and as a Church of England.

In 1991, IOR Victoria combined with the IOR in other states to form a national private health fund. Members wishing to join IOR's health fund were no longer required to sign a pledge of abstinence from alcohol. In 2005 the IOR health fund was sold to HCF Health Insurance, and the rest of the organisation continued as a temperance promoting organisation. In 2008, 38.5 million dollars of its funds management was transferred to the Foresters Friendly Society. As of 2013, the Independent Order of Rechabites retains state branches in NSW, Victoria and Queensland, each with a number of affiliated tents.

United Kingdom
Since 2004 the Rechabite Friendly Society has traded as Healthy Investment, a financial services organisation that continues to specialise in providing ethical savings and investment products, not restricted to teetotallers. The Society avoids direct investment in companies in the alcohol, arms, tobacco, gambling and pornography industries. It is a with-profits provider, which as a mutual insurance company means that there are no shareholders to benefit from members' investments.

The Society provides Tax Exempt Savings Plans only offered by Friendly Societies, and other savings products.

Archives
The archives of the Independent Order of Rechabites have been deposited at Senate House Library, University of London. Some material, including a history of the Glasgow District No. 40, is also held by the Archives of the University of Glasgow. Numerous archives of branches are held at local record offices.

See also
 List of Rechabite halls
 Christian views on alcohol
 Temperance movement

References

Publications 

Leach, W. T. (William Turnbull), 1805-1886 An address on rechabitism: delivered at the quarterly meeting of the members of the Independent Order of Rechabites, in the hall of the Spring of Canada Tent on the 18th July, 1845 Montreal? : s.n.] 1845
Rules for the government of the Stepney Tent, no. 83 : of the Independent Order of Rechabites, Salford Unity, Friendly Society, East Riding District Hull : Printed by F. Oliver 1873
General laws for the government of the Independent Order of Rechabites, Salford Unity, Friendly Society : adopted by the Moveable Conference, August, 1853, and amended by subsequent M.C.s, 1854 to 1873 : registered under the Friendly Societies' Act 13 and 14 Victoria, Cap. 115 Manchester : Published by the Board of Directors, at the Offices of the Order 1873
Rules of the Independent Order of Rechabites, Salford Unity, Friendly Society, as amended by the Glasgow H.M.C., 1887 : registered under the Friendly Societies Acts 1887

External links
 Official site of the Australian Rechabites
 Records of the Independent Order of Rechabites at Senate House Library
 History of the Rechabites
 Another history
 History of the Rechabites on the Isle of Man
 More notes from the Isle of Man, linking the formation of the Rechabites to the Order of Oddfellows and therefore indirectly to Freemasonry.

1835 establishments in England
Alcohol in England
Alcohol in the United Kingdom
Fraternal orders
Friendly societies of the United Kingdom
Organizations established in 1835
Temperance organizations